My Ordinary Love Story (lit. "The Memory of My Romance") is a 2014 South Korean romantic comedy/mystery thriller starring Kang Ye-won and Song Sae-byeok. It was the closing film of the 18th Bucheon International Fantastic Film Festival.

Plot
Eun-jin struggles to make her seventh relationship work after six failed ones. But she begins to suspect that her new boyfriend, bumbling but sweet Hyun-suk, may be hiding something.

Cast
Kang Ye-won as Park Eun-jin
Song Sae-byeok as Hyun-suk 
Greena Park as So-young
Kim Hyun-joon as Park Eun-kyul
Woo Hye-jin as Girl in cafe

References

External links

South Korean romantic comedy films
South Korean comedy mystery films
Films directed by Lee Kwon
2014 romantic comedy films
2010s comedy mystery films
2010s South Korean films